Derek Steven Hagan Jr. (born September 21, 1984) is a former American football wide receiver. He was drafted by the Miami Dolphins in the third round of the 2006 NFL Draft. He played college football at Arizona State University. Hagan has also previously played for the New York Giants, Buffalo Bills and Oakland Raiders. Derek coaches up and coming wide receivers, and has a successful real estate practice in Chandler, AZ

Early years
Hagan attended Palmdale High School in Palmdale, California, where he earned all-conference honors his junior and senior seasons. He caught 65 passes for 843 yards on offense and had 23 tackles and four interceptions on defense as a junior. He caught 78 passes for a school record 1020 yards and five touchdowns as a senior, while adding nine interceptions on defense. He was the team MVP as both a junior and a senior. Hagan also triple jumped 46 feet and averaged 12 points and five rebounds in basketball. He was a team captain in two sports his senior year: football and track.

College career
Hagan was recruited to Arizona State University by head coach Dirk Koetter whom he played under for two years. He is second in Pac-10 history for career receptions with 258, and in career receiving yards with 3,939. Hagan also caught a pass in 41 consecutive games to end his career, and had at least one reception in 48 of 50 career games.

He surpassed 1,000 yards receiving in each of his final three years as a Sun Devil, leading the team each time. As a senior in 2005, he was voted co-captain of the team and caught 77 passes for 1,210 yards and eight touchdowns. Hagan earned All-American honors three times and All-Pac-10 honors twice.

College awards and honors
 The Sporting News Pac-10 All-Freshman (2002)
 Honorable mention All-Pac 10 (2003)
 Biletnikoff Award semi-finalist (2004)
 Second-team All-Pac 10 (2004)
 Rivals.com second-team All-American (2004)
 Rivals.com All-Pac 10 (2004)
 Arizona State Offensive MVP (2005)
 Biletnikoff Award semi-finalist (2005)
 First-team All-Pac-10 (2005)
 Rivals.com Third-team All-American (2005)
 SI.com honorable mention All-American (2005)

Professional career

Miami Dolphins
Despite his great career at ASU, Hagan had a poor showing during the Senior Bowl practices by dropping passes, which many predicted would damage his stock in the upcoming draft. He ran a 4.45 40-yard dash at the NFL Combine. He was drafted in the third round (82nd overall) of the 2006 NFL Draft by the Miami Dolphins. His draft preparation with IMG was chronicled in the film Two Days in April.

Hagan spent the majority of his rookie season in 2006 as the Dolphins' fourth receiver behind starters Chris Chambers and Marty Booker and slot receiver Wes Welker. His problems with dropped passes continued throughout much of the season, and he failed to distinguish himself as a legitimate receiving threat. These drops, combined with the struggles of the Dolphins offense as a whole, resulted in a largely uneventful rookie campaign for Hagan. He finished the season with 21 catches for 221 yards and one touchdown in 14 games. The lone score came in an October 22 loss to the Green Bay Packers on a pass from Joey Harrington.

Hagan looked to get back on track in 2007 under new head coach Cam Cameron. He was given the chance to compete for playing time with the trade of Wes Welker to the New England Patriots. Hagan finished the year with 373 yards and two touchdowns in the 2007 season.

Nine weeks into the 2008 regular season, Hagan was released by the Dolphins on November 4. He had three receptions for 51 yards on the season.

New York Giants
Hagan was signed by the New York Giants on December 16, 2008, after running back Reuben Droughns was placed on injured reserve. His only touchdown that season came against the Washington Redskins.

He was released on September 4, 2010, during final roster cuts. On November 16, 2010, the Giants resigned Hagan, following injuries to Giants receivers Steve Smith and Ramses Barden. He became an unrestricted free agent after the season.

Oakland Raiders
Hagan was signed by the Oakland Raiders on August 6, 2011. He was released on November 2, 2011, when Oakland signed former Cincinnati Bengals wide receiver T. J. Houshmandzadeh.

Buffalo Bills
Hagan signed with the Buffalo Bills on November 22, 2011. He played in four games and collected 13 reception for 138 yards and one touchdown. He was resigned by the Bills on March 19, 2012, but was let go during final cuts.

Oakland Raiders (second stint)
On September 5, 2012, Hagan was signed again by the Oakland Raiders.

Tampa Bay Buccaneers
On June 13, 2013, Hagan signed with the Tampa Bay Buccaneers. On August 26, 2013, he was released by the Buccaneers.

Tennessee Titans
Hagan was signed by the Tennessee Titans on June 17, 2014, but is now a free agent.

Personal life
Derek earned a Bachelor of Science degree in justice studies while at Arizona State University. He was a high school teammate of former Miami Dolphins safety Tyrone Culver.

Coaching career 
On April 12, 2018, Derek was named offensive analyst for Arizona State football.

References

External links
Tampa Bay Buccaneers bio
Oakland Raiders bio
Buffalo Bills bio
Arizona State Sun Devils bio

1984 births
Living people
People from Northridge, Los Angeles
Players of American football from Los Angeles
American football wide receivers
Arizona State Sun Devils football players
Miami Dolphins players
New York Giants players
Oakland Raiders players
Buffalo Bills players
Tampa Bay Buccaneers players
Tennessee Titans players